Sherred is a surname. Notable people with the surname include:

Claire Sherred (born 1956), British luger
T. L. Sherred (1915–1985), American science fiction writer

See also
Sherrod